Sami Habib Rihana (born on 6 February 1941) is a Lebanese Brigadier General in the Lebanese army, a historian with two PhDs from Paris-Sorbonne University (Paris IV) and a publisher.

Born in the village of Kousba in the Koura District of North Lebanon in 1941, he enrolled in the Lebanese military school in 1958 and followed several formations in his military career in France, Belgium and the United States.

He ran in the 2022 Lebanese General Elections for the Greek Orthodox seat in North 3 (Bcharre – Zgharta – Koura – Batroun).

Formation 
 1956 - 1958: Lebanon - Military school
 1962 - 1963: France - Military training 
 1976: USA - "Follow me" infantry advanced course - United States Infantry School - Fort Benning, Georgia 
1979: USA - Military management course
 1981 - 1983: Belgium - Breveté d'Etat Major
 1983: France - Doctorat de troisième cycle (PhD) - Paris-Sorbonne University (Paris IV)
 1986: France - Doctorat d'état (PhD) - Paris-Sorbonne University (Paris IV)

Functions

Military positions 

 1968 - 1971: Company commander
 1978 - 1981: Battalion commander
 1984 - 1985: Commander of the demilitarized zone in Beirut
 1983 - 1985: Chief of the cease fire Committee in Lebanon
 1985 - 1990: Commander of the 7th Infantry Brigade
 1992 - 1999: Chief of the situation room in the presidential palace

Functions 

 1975 - 1976: Professor of military history at the officers school
 1988 - 1999: Professor of military history at the armed forces school
 1989 - 2003: Professor of history at the Lebanese University
 2000 to date: Chairman & General Manager of Nobilis Publishing House

Works 
 1988: The Contemporary History of the Lebanese Army (Volume 1): The origins - The Orient legion and the auxiliary troops of the Levant (1916–1926) • Histoire de l'armée libanaise contemporaine (Tome 1): Les origines - La légion d'Orient et les troupes auxiliaires du Levant (1916-1926)
 1993: Encyclopedia of the rural heritage (3 volumes)
 1996: The Contemporary History of the Lebanese Army (Volume 2): The special troops of the Levant and the army of the independence (1926–1946) • Histoire de l'armée Libanaise contemporaine: Les Troupes spéciales du Levant et l'Armée de l'indépendance (1926-1946)
 1996: The military societies across history
 1998: The world at the dawn of the 21st century
 2001: The people of the ancient near-east
 2002: The history of the economy
 2002: Lebanon across centuries (10 volumes)
 2005: Arabs battles encyclopedia (24 volumes)
 2006: The July 2006 war encyclopedia (10 volumes)
 2007: The war of Nahr El Bared 2007
 Legends and peoples of the world (10 volumes)
 Lebanon's presidential and ministerial crises (16 volumes)
 Michel Aoun encyclopedia (18 volumes)
 Kamal Joumblat encyclopedia (18 volumes)

Honors 
Ordre National du Mérite Francais
Cedar Medal (Lebanon)
War Medal (Lebanon)
National Order of Merit (Lebanon)

References

1941 births
20th-century Lebanese historians
Lebanese military personnel
Academic staff of Lebanese University
Living people
Military historians
Paris-Sorbonne University alumni
People from Koura District
21st-century Lebanese historians